On 29 November 1975, a bomb exploded in the arrivals terminal of Dublin Airport, killing a man and injuring nine other people. The Ulster Defence Association (UDA), a loyalist paramilitary group from Northern Ireland, claimed responsibility for the bombing. It was one of a series of loyalist bomb attacks in the Republic of Ireland between the late 1960s and mid 1970s.

Background
Loyalists had been carrying out bomb attacks in the Republic of Ireland, mainly in Dublin, and in border counties Cavan, Donegal, Louth and Monaghan, since the beginning of the Troubles in August 1969. Several of these had resulted in fatalities. Three civilians were killed and almost 200 injured in the 1972 and 1973 Dublin bombings, while 34 civilians were killed in the Dublin and Monaghan bombings in 1974, the deadliest attack of the Troubles.

The bombing
On the afternoon of 29 November 1975, a bomb exploded in the public toilets in the arrivals terminal of Dublin Airport. It killed Aer Lingus worker John Hayes (38), who lived in Balbriggan, and injured nine others. According to bomb experts the bomb was hidden in a toilet tissue dispenser and went off after Hayes washed his hands and was about to leave. The blast ripped through a wall into a public bar where about thirty people were sitting. The airport was evacuated and a second bomb was found and safely detonated by a bomb disposal team.

Aftermath
The UDA claimed responsibility for the bombing shortly after. It said it was "retaliation for the murders of members of the British security forces by the IRA operating unhindered from the haven of the Republic with the blessing of the Dublin government". 

Political leaders and the main political parties condemned the bombing. Social Democratic and Labour Party (SDLP) leader Gerry Fitt said it was "crazy that the UDA was still a fully legalised organisation" in the United Kingdom.

The UDA bombed Dublin again 11 years later in November 1986, planting four small bombs in bins. Two of the bombs were defused but the other two detonated, although they only caused minor damage and a small fire and nobody was killed or injured. The UDA said they planted the bombs in protest at the Anglo-Irish Agreement of 1985.

See also
 RTE Studio bombing
 Belturbet bombing 
 1972 and 1973 Dublin bombings
 Dublin and Monaghan bombings
 1975 Dundalk pub bombing 
 Castleblayney bombing
 1994 Dublin-Belfast train bombing

References

Notes

1975 murders in the Republic of Ireland
Attacks on buildings and structures in 1975
Attacks on buildings and structures in the Republic of Ireland
Aviation accidents and incidents in 1975
Crime in County Dublin
Bombing
Terrorist incidents in Dublin (city)
History of Fingal
Improvised explosive device bombings in 1975
Improvised explosive device bombings in the Republic of Ireland
November 1975 crimes
November 1975 events in Europe
Terrorist attacks on airports
Terrorist incidents in Europe in 1975
Terrorist incidents in the Republic of Ireland in the 1970s
Ulster Defence Association actions
Building bombings in Europe